Budhiram Tudu (born 3 August 1991 in Kolkata, West Bengal) is an Indian football player who currently plays for I-League club Mohammedan.

Club career

East Bengal
Born in Pandua, West Bengal, after spending a season playing for the Kingfisher East Bengal F.C. youth team in the youth championships Tudu signed professional terms with the club.

He was welcomed on loan by United Sikkim F.C. in the 2010 I-League 2nd Division where he executed some sparkling demonstrations of his goal scoring potentiality. He scored an outstanding hat-trick against Golden Threads F.C. to take his side to the final. He was in a glittering form throughout scoring 8 goals, highest in that round.

During his first professional season with the club Tudu played in five I-League matches, all coming off the bench, and four cup matches.

United Sikkim
Tudu made his debut for United Sikkim on 20 September 2012 against Pune F.C. during the 2012 Indian Federation Cup.

Mohammedan
Tudu signed for Mohammedan Sporting for a one-year deal.

Career statistics

Club
Statistics accurate as of 11 October 2012

References

Indian footballers
1991 births
Living people
Footballers from Kolkata
Calcutta Football League players
I-League players
East Bengal Club players
United Sikkim F.C. players
Mohammedan SC (Kolkata) players
Association football forwards